WNIT may refer to:

 WNIT (TV), a television station in South Bend, Indiana (channel 31, virtual 34)
 Women's National Invitation Tournament